The Battle of Donkey Island was a skirmish that occurred on 30 June and 1 July 2007 between elements of the U.S. Army Task Force 1-77 Armor Regiment, the 2nd Battalion 5th Marines and a numerically superior force of al-Qaeda in Iraq insurgents on the banks of a canal leading from Ramadi to Lake Habbaniyah in the Al-Anbar province of Iraq.

Official reports of the clash indicate that the U.S. force suffered 2 soldiers dead and 11 wounded, while an estimated 32 insurgents were killed (out of an estimated force of 40–70 fighters).  From a military perspective, the battle was a complete victory for the U.S. forces, which detected and defeated an insurgent force before it could launch a planned assault on Ramadi.  From a political perspective, the action revealed the continuing ability of al-Qaeda in Iraq to plan and assemble forces in their attempt to destabilize the Anbar region.

Battle
On the night of 30 June 2007, a routine patrol on the outskirts of Ramadi revealed the presence of a company-sized element of insurgent forces.  Partially hidden behind two trucks, the insurgents began firing on the reconnaissance group, forcing them to retreat to nearby cover and calling for backup forces.

A platoon-sized element arrived a short while later to reinforce the American patrol.  Although outnumbered, the U.S. force brought superior firepower to bear and eventually began to shift the tide of battle.  With continuing ground fire, and later with air support, the American troops killed more than 30 insurgents and managed to destroy their two trucks carrying large quantities of weapons and ammunition before calm took over early in the morning.

On 1 July, the insurgent fighters resumed the battle by ambushing elements of the U.S. Army, resulting in a quick firefight which ended the battle.

In the following days, follow-up missions were conducted by the U.S. Army and the U.S. Marines on both sides of the canal to ensure all insurgent forces were eliminated.

Insurgency
On February 13, 2007 around 23 men of the Army of the Men of the Naqshbandi Order seized a couple of villages in and around Ramadi, acting as a government they claimed that they have around 500 soldiers in Ramadi alone, and told remaining Iraqi forces that if they don't retreat from Ramadi, a battle of bloodshed will be fought. The remaining Iraqi forces in Ramadi hunted down the "hundreds" of soldiers only to find it was just one group of clandestine Tikritis, all of whom were arrested on February 15, 2007 only two days later.

See also

 2007 in Iraq
 Iraq War in Anbar Province

References

External links
 Recreation of the Battle of Donkey Island

Battles of the Iraq War involving the United States
Battles of the Iraq War in 2007
United States Marine Corps in the Iraq War
June 2007 events in Iraq
July 2007 events in Iraq